Yabalakly (Yabalaqlı) is a rural locality (a selo) in Shingak-Kulsky Selsoviet, Chishminsky District, Bashkortostan, Russia. The population was 277 as of 2010. There are 4 streets.

Geography 
Yabalakly is located 29 km south of Chishmy (the district's administrative centre) by road. Novye Yabalakly is the nearest rural locality.

References 

Rural localities in Chishminsky District